William Nicol Fife (October 16, 1831 in Perthshire, Scotland – October 21, 1915) was an architect in early Utah. His works included the original Ogden Pioneer Tabernacle, Ogden Central School, and the Weber Courthouse, none of which are standing today. He was the father of William W. Fife, another Utah architect.

Sources

19th-century American architects
Architects from Utah
Architects of Latter Day Saint religious buildings and structures
1831 births
1915 deaths
British emigrants to the United States